The National Integration Party is a political party in Costa Rica. The party mainly endorses perennial candidate Dr. Walter Muñoz Céspedes, a San Jose medical doctor and five-time presidential candidate, normally with about 1% or less of the vote. In the 2018 election, it endorsed the candidacy of former minister and defense lawyer Juan Diego Castro reaching 9% of the vote, although Castro and the party angrily split pathways soon after the election.

The party first contested general elections in 1998, in which it won a single seat, taken by Walter Muñoz Céspedes, who was also their candidate in the presidential election, where he finished fourth with 1.4%. However, the party lost its seat in the 2002 elections in which it received 1.7% of the vote. In the presidential election that year Muñoz finished sixth with just 0.4%. In the 2010 elections the party received only 0.8% of the vote and remained without parliamentary representation, whilst Muñoz won just 0.17% of the vote in the presidential elections. In that election, the party's vice-presidential candidate was the historic leftist leader and professor Álvaro Montero Mejía. However, two weeks before the election, the party stopped its campaign and endorsed Otton Solís, from Citizens' Action Party, in an effort to build a progressive alliance against Laura Chinchilla, candidate of the National Liberation Party. For the 2014 election Muñoz was, again, both presidential and legislative candidate gaining around 3000 votes (0.21%), the least voted candidate in that election. In 2016 Costa Rican municipal elections, the party won the position of syndic of the district of Santa Cruz for its candidate Arcadio Carrera. In 2020 Costa Rican municipal elections, Carrera ran for Mayor of Santa Cruz. Incumbent Vicemayor of Golfito, Hannia Herra, elected originally by the National Liberation Party in 2016 election, joined the party and is also a candidate for Mayor of Golfito for 2020. Carrera and Herra's platforms are mainly seen as progressive and even leftist, opposing domination of beach areas by big resorts in their respective cantons.

According to Muñoz the party opposes taxes, immigration, same-sex marriage and same-sex civil unions, and it also supports a public monopoly of fuel distribution. The party supports state control of prices for medicine, which are unregulated in Costa Rica. It also has opposed reductions of the public healthcare budget for combating cancer. One of the party's congresswomen, Patricia Villegas, is especially known for her efforts on modernizing national laws on HIV, in order to promote the human rights of HIV positive people.

Notable members 

 Marvin Calvo Montoya
 Eugenio Padilla Bonilla

Electoral performance

Presidential

Parliamentary

References

Political parties in Costa Rica
Conservative parties in Costa Rica
Political parties established in 1996
Social conservative parties